The Awassi is a local fat-tailed sheep breed in South-West Asia originated in the Syro-Arabian desert. Other local names can also be Arab (not to be confused with Arabi sheep), Baladi, Deiri, Syrian, Ausi, Nuami, Gezirieh (or Qezirieh), or Ivesi (Turkish). It is multi coloured: white with brown head and legs (sometimes also black or brown). The ears are long and drooping.

Habitat
The Awassi is the most prevalent sheep breed in the Arab World. The Awassi sheep breed is common in most of the Middle East Countries including Saudi Arabia, Jordan, Iraq, Syria, Lebanon, Israel, Palestine, and Egypt. It is an extremely hardy breed, well adapted over centuries of use to nomadic and more sedentary rural management. The Awassi is the natural or basic breed of sheep for production in these areas and a logical choice as the native or basic breed for any genetic improvement because of its apparent adaptation.

Characteristics

It is used for a range of products; meat, milk and wool.  However, this breed is raised primarily for milk. They have unique physiological characteristics such as resistance to many diseases and parasites, walk long distances over pastures for grazing, tolerating extreme temperatures and enduring adverse feeding conditions. It easily adapts to different environments and performs as well as in its native habitat. Awassi sheep are well-adapted to the poor Mediterranean pasture and can compensate for under-nutrition during the dry season by using the stored energy reserves in the fat tail. It has a high mothering ability. Due to its high milk producing potential under harsh conditions, the Awassi breed can be used as a sire breed in improving milk production of many indigenous Asiatic and African breeds. The Awassi breed is known to be the highest milking breed after the East Friesian breed.

Awassi sheep can be kept under a wide range of production systems, from nomadic flocks relying on natural pasture in semi-arid areas where lamb production is the primary products, to intensive dairy flocks where milk and lambs contribute almost equally to the flock gross income, and it is known for its hardiness and adaptability.

Awassi sheep are very popular in the middle east Syria Turky Iraq and Egypt. It has a medium size compared to other sheep’s however sheep size may vary between different countries.  The whole body is covered with wool, while the head and legs are short and shiny, sometimes the chest and belly are bare. The head, ears and front part of the neck are red, brown or black, these colors cover different parts of the body. White, gray or mottled colors are sometimes observed. Although horned animals are characterized by large, spiral-shaped, numerous wrinkled horns, there are a few hornless animals. The majority of ewes have no horns, however 25% of the female population may have short straight or bow-shaped horns. The ears are long and drooping, and sometimes small, rudimentary or absent. The tail is broad, rounded, medium-sized and bi-layered with a bare fat pad on the underside and extending to the ankles. The middle of the tail is narrow, woolly and curved upwards, ending with a short, thin appendage.

See also

 Assaf (sheep)

References

Sheep breeds
Sheep breeds originating in Saudi Arabia
Sheep breeds originating in Iraq
Animal breeds originating in Israel
Animal breeds originating in Syria
Animal breeds originating in Egypt